The PPU was a British pilot union that represented a minority of the pilots of Virgin Atlantic.

History 

On 26 November 2012 the PPU was certified as a new union by the Trades Union Certification Officer. "The PPU was launched after a poll of 548 Virgin Atlantic pilots in June 2012 returned a 76% response and an 87.4% vote in favour" of setting up a new union to represent its members needs.

The PPU’s AR21 form for the year ending 31 December 2018 declared it had 325 members. It represents 30% of Virgin Atlantic's pilots.

The AR21 for year ending 31 December 2018 shows a deficit of £150,840 for the year and an amount remaining in their general fund of £175,492

The PPU motto is "Safety, Professionalism, Respect".

The PPU is a web-based "e-union" using technology to give it and its members a global 24/7/365 presence. Membership is no longer restricted to pilots from Virgin Atlantic. The PPU has members in TUI Airways and British Airways.

The PPU Mission Statement

1. To fully represent and robustly support members of the PPU and to actively promote and augment professional pilots’ terms & conditions, pay, working environment and professional status.

2. To be prepared to engage collectively to uphold the interests of its members.

3. To work with Industry and Government to enhance:-
a. Flight safety
b. Environmentally sound industry practice

4. To be the effective and recognised representative body for pilots of carriers throughout the industry.

The union was dissolved in February 2021.

See also
British Airline Pilots' Association
Independent Pilots Association (United Kingdom)

References

External links 

Trade unions in the United Kingdom
Aviation organisations based in the United Kingdom
Airline pilots' trade unions
2012 establishments in the United Kingdom
Trade unions established in 2012
Trade unions disestablished in 2021
Trade unions based in Cheshire